The Japanese automobile manufacturer Daihatsu, a wholly owned subsidiary of Toyota Group since 2016, has produced a number of vehicles since its inception in 1951.

Current production vehicles

Former production vehicles 

 Applause
 Ascend/Valéra
 Bee
 Be‣go
 Boon Luminas
 Ceria (rebadge of Perodua Kancil)
 Charade
 Charmant (rebadge of Toyota Corolla)
 Compagno
 Coo/Materia (OEM supply as Toyota bB and Subaru Dex)
 Consorte
 Delta
 Esse
 Extol
 Fellow Max
 Hijet Caddie
 Hijet Gran Cargo/Extol
 Hi-Max
 Leeza
 Leeza Spider
 Max
 Mebius 
 Midget/Midget II
 Mira/Cuore/Domino/Handi/Handivan
 Mira Cocoa
 Mira Gino
 Move Conte
 Move Latte
 Naked
 New Line
 Opti
 Pyzar/Gran Move/Grand Move
 Rocky/Feroza/Sportrak (F300)
 Rugger/Rocky/Fourtrak/Taft/Hiline/Feroza (F70) (OEM supply as Toyota Blizzard)
 Sonica
 Storia (OEM supply as Toyota Duet)
 Taft (F10/F20/F50/F60)/Scat (OEM supply as Toyota Blizzard)
 Tanto Exe (OEM supply as Subaru Lucra)
 Taruna
 Trevis
 Wake
 YRV
 Zebra/Hijet Zebra/Hijet Maxx/Citivan

Former commercial vehicles 

 Charade Van
 Charmant Van
 Compagno Van/Truck
 FA pickup truck
 Delta series
 Hi-Line/F series
 Hijet Caddie
 Hijet Gran Cargo/Extol
 Hijet Zebra/Zebra/Hijet Maxx/Citivan (OEM supply as Perodua Rusa)
 Hi-Max
 Light Bus series
 Midget
 Mira Van/Walk-through Van/Miracab
 New Line
 Taft Truck (F25/55)
 Vesta/V series

Three-wheeled trucks 

 BF (1962) 1¼-ton
 BM (1962) 1½-ton
 BO (1961) 2-ton
 CF (1962) 1¼-ton
 CM (1962) 1½-ton
 CO (1963) 2-ton
 HA (1930)
 HB (1931)
 HD (1931)
 HF (1933)
 HS (1934)
 HT (1933)
 Midget DK/DS/MP (1957–72)
 PF (1958) 1¼-ton
 PL (1958) 1-ton
 PM (1958) 1½-ton
 PO (1959) 2-ton
 RKF (1957) 1-ton
 RKM (1957) 1½-ton
 RKO (1956) 2-ton
 RO (1958)
 SCA (1955) ¾-ton
 SCB (1955) 1-ton
 SCE (1955) 1-ton
 SCO (1955) 2-ton
 SE/SSE (1946) ½-ton
 SDB (1956) 1-ton
 SDF (1956) 1-ton
 SF (1948) ½-ton
 SH (1949) ½-ton
 SK (1951) ½-ton
 SKD (1957) 1-ton
 SKC (1958) ¾-ton
 SDF/SSDF (1956) 1-ton
 SN/SSN (1952) 1-ton
 SSH (1950) ¾-ton
 SX (1954)
 UF (1960) 1¼-ton
 UM (1960) 1½-ton
 UO (1960) 2-ton

Racing cars 

 P-3
 P-5

Concept vehicles

See also 
 Daihatsu
 Toyota
 List of Toyota vehicles
 Subaru

Daihatsu
Daihatsu